Denny Solomona (born 27 September 1993) is a rugby footballer who played rugby union as a winger for  England at international level. He previously played rugby union for Sale Sharks in Premiership Rugby and played rugby league as a winger for the Melbourne Storm Under-20s, London Broncos and the Castleford Tigers (Heritage № 951). He played for Samoa at international rugby league.

Youth
Solomona was born and brought up in Auckland, and was educated first at Ōtāhuhu College then at St Peter's College where he was a member of the school's Rugby Union First XV and won the Boris Shroj Cup in 2010 as the top try scorer.

Rugby League
In 2012, Solomona became a member of the Melbourne Storm Rugby League franchise being recruited out of Melbourne's youth system. He only played 13 games during the 2012 National Youth Competition season, with a fractured fibula in Round 13. Nevertheless, the 19-year-old scored eight tries from those 13 games. Solomona joined the Melbourne Storm's senior squad in 2013.

Solomona signed for Super League side London Broncos in January 2014 after being released from his contract with Melbourne Storm. Following the club's relegation, it was announced that he would join Castleford Tigers at the end of the season.

In 2016, Solomona scored a record-breaking 37th try in a single Super League season in Castleford's Super 8s win over Catalans. The try broke a 12-year record held by former dual-international, Lesley Vainikolo. Solomona finished the season with a total of 40 tries along with another 2 in the Challenge Cup competition. On 8 October 2016 Solomona made his International début for Samoa in their historical test match against Fiji in Apia.

Rugby Union
On 13 December 2016, it was confirmed that Solomona had retired from rugby league, with two years still remaining on his contract with Castleford Tigers, to switch to rugby union, and join Sale Sharks in the Aviva Premiership. The move was subject to a legal dispute which was concluded out of court as Sale paid Castleford some £200,000 in compensation. On 29 March 2017, having enjoyed a prolific start to his career with Sale (10 tries in 11 appearances), Solomona declared himself available for international selection with England. He was subsequently called up to the senior England squad by Eddie Jones for their 2017 summer tour of Argentina and came on as a sub in the opening test and scored the winning try on his debut.l

International tries

Influences
Solomona feels that meeting senior players can be important for the motivation and development of school age players.

References

External links

 
Sale Sharks Profile
2015 Castleford Tigers Profile

1993 births
Living people
Castleford Tigers players
Dual-code rugby internationals
England international rugby union players
Expatriate rugby union players in England
London Broncos players
London Skolars players
New Zealand expatriate rugby union players
New Zealand expatriate sportspeople in England
New Zealand sportspeople of Samoan descent
New Zealand rugby league players
New Zealand rugby union players
People educated at St Peter's College, Auckland
Rugby league players from Auckland
Rugby league wingers
Rugby union players from Auckland
Rugby union wings
Sale Sharks players
Samoa national rugby league team players
English rugby union players
Highlanders (rugby union) players
North Harbour rugby union players